The Volleyball Federation of India (VFI) is the governing body of volleyball in India.

History
The Volleyball Federation of India was formed in the year 1951. Prior to the formation of the Volleyball Federation of India (VFI), the game was controlled by the Indian Olympic Association (IOA) and at that time the Interstate Volleyball Championship was held every two years from 1936 to 1950 for men only. The first Championship was held in the year 1936 at Lahore (now in Pakistan). In 1951, the Volleyball Federation of India was formed and its first meeting was held in Ludhiana (Punjab).

National teams

Men
India men's national volleyball team
India men's national under-20 volleyball team
India men's national under-18 volleyball team

Women
India women's national volleyball team
India women's national under-20 volleyball team
India women's national under-18 volleyball team

Tournaments
Asian Games 1986

The Indian team which was coached by late Achutha Kurup and Sethumadhvan and captained by Cyril Valoor won the bronze medal. The following shared the team in 1986 and since then India has not won any medal in Asian Games till date:
Abdul Basith 
Jimmy George 
K. Udayakumar (Late - died in Heart attack in Trivandrum, Kerala)
Shaikh Kareemullah Khan 
Mehar Singh
Kirtesh Kumar Trivedi
Dalel Singh
Sandeep Sharma
Sukhpal Singh
P. V. Ramana
G. E. Sridharan

See also
Indian Volley League
Pro Volleyball League
Prime Volleyball League

References

External links
Official website

India
Volleyball
Federation
Organisations based in Chennai
1951 establishments in Madras State
Sports organizations established in 1951